Coatopa is an unincorporated community  in Sumter County, Alabama, United States.

History
Coatopa was founded in 1847 by J. R. Larkins and was located on the East Tennessee, Virginia and Georgia Railway. The name Coatopa is derived from the Choctaw words koi meaning "panther," a meaning "there," and hotupa meaning "wounded." A post office operated under the name Coatopa from 1866 to 1986.

Notable person
Kelly Mitchell, Queen of the Gypsy Nation, died in Coatopa in 1915

References

Unincorporated communities in Alabama
Unincorporated communities in Sumter County, Alabama
Populated places established in 1847
1847 establishments in Alabama
Alabama placenames of Native American origin